Barbara Fugger (née Bäsinger; 1419 – 23 July 1497) was a German businessperson and banker.

Biography
Barbara Bäsinger was born to a wealthy family in Augsburg, Germany. In 1441, she married textile merchant Jakob Fugger the Elder. She had eleven children with him before he died, including Ulrich, Georg and Jakob Fugger. She successfully managed the family business and eventually traded internationally in linen and wool. She provided money for her sons' businesses and her daughters' dowries. After the death of her spouse in 1469, she managed the Fugger bank until her death in 1497. She was assisted by her sons, but they did not gain full access until after her death.

Notes

References
  stichwortartige Biographie auf schwabenmedia.de
  Hochspringen nach: a b c d Antonius Lux (Hrsg.): Große Frauen der Weltgeschichte. Tausend Biographien in Wort und Bild. Sebastian Lux Verlag, München 1963, S. 176.
  Hochspringen ↑ Mark Häberlein: Die Fugger: Geschichte einer Augsburger Familie, 1367–1650, Kohlhammer Verlag, Stuttgart, 2006
  Hochspringen ↑ Geneanet.org, Stichwort Barbara Bäsinger

1419 births
1497 deaths
15th-century German women
Barbara
15th-century German businesspeople
German bankers
Medieval bankers
Medieval businesswomen
Businesspeople from Augsburg